The Story of a Modern Woman is a novel written by English author Ella Hepworth Dixon. The novel was first published in 1894 and is an example of the "New Woman" genre of late-Victorian England. The life of the protagonist, Mary Erle, loosely follows that of Hepworth Dixon: both the author and the character turned to journalism as a way of sustaining themselves after the death of their fathers.

References

External links
The full novel is available online as part of the Victorian Women Writers Project .
Full text of 1894 publication at archive.org 
 

1894 British novels